Ishkashim (also transliterated Eshkashem or Ashkāsham) is a border town in Badakhshan Province of Afghanistan. With a population of around 12,120 people, the town serves as the capital of Ishkashim District. Another town by the same name is located on the other side of the Panj River in the Gorno-Badakhshan region of Tajikistan, although that town is normally transliterated Ishkoshim following Tajik practice. A bridge linking the two towns was reconstructed in 2006.

Ishkashim lies in a fertile valley at an elevation of  meters. There are roughly 20 settlements in the valley, but, considering the cultivation in the valley is contiguous, it could also be considered one single, larger settlement. The valley has only one harvest per year. Wheat and barley are cultivated. Poplar and chinar trees grow as well, but there is little firewood.

Ishkashim is connected by road with Fayzabad in the northwest, through the town of Baharak. It is also connected to the towns of Zebak in the southwest and Khandud in the northeast. The valley lies in an important strategic area, as it commands the only route between Fayzabad, Shighnan, and Wakhan accessible during the winter. It has a number of small shops, hotels, guest houses, schools and government buildings, including a base for the Afghan Border Police.

History

Ishkashim and Wakhan became an Islamic region during the Samanid Empire. It fell to the Ghaznavids followed by the Ghurids and others. It officially became part of the modern state of Afghanistan after rulers of the Qing dynasty of China signed a treaty with Ahmad Shah Durrani, the founder of the last Afghan Empire. It was reshaped during the rule of Abdur Rahman Khan in the late 19th century after he agreed on the Durand Line with Mortimer Durand. Afghanistan as a whole became a buffer state between what was then the Russian Empire and British India. It is currently patrolled by forces of the Islamic Emirate of Afghanistan, which took over responsibility from the previous NATO-trained Afghan National Security Forces.

Climate
The climate is generally cold, but much warmer than that of neighboring areas, such as Wakhan District. Ishkashim has a subarctic climate (Köppen climate classification Dsc) with brief, pleasant summers and cold, snowy winters. About  of precipitation falls annually.

Demographics

Dari is the official language in Ishkashim, Afghanistan. The people in the area are mostly Tajiks and Uzbeks. Historically, there have also been many followers of Nizari Isma'ilism in the area, who are called Ishkashimis. Some of whom may speak the Ishkashimi language in addition to Dari.

See also
Sher Khan Bandar
Valleys of Afghanistan
Transport in Afghanistan
Wakhjir Pass

References

External links

Satellite map at Maplandia.com

Populated places in Ishkashim District
Afghanistan–Tajikistan border crossings